The European Union Chamber Orchestra (EUCO) is a chamber orchestra with funding from the European Commission, founded in 1981 and initially known as the European Community Chamber Orchestra.

The orchestra has toured worldwide and broadcast on BBC Radio 3. It has performed with at that time debuting Peter Donohoe, Nikolai Demidenko, Amandine Savary, Sheku Kanneh-Mason, and Tasmin Little. The orchestra has produced 18 CDs.

See also
 Chamber Orchestra of Europe
 European Union Baroque Orchestra
 European Union Youth Orchestra

References

External links
 EUCO website

1981 establishments in Europe
Musical groups established in 1981
Chamber orchestras
European orchestras
Organizations related to the European Union
Music and the European Union
Pan-European music organizations